The Thailand men's national volleyball team represents Thailand in international volleyball competitions and friendly matches, governed by Thailand Volleyball Association.

Competition history

World Championship
 Champions   Runners up   Third place   Fourth place

Asian Championship
 Champions   Runners up   Third place   Fourth place

Asian Games
 Champions   Runners up   Third place   Fourth place

Asian Cup
 Champions   Runners up   Third place   Fourth place

Southeast Asian Games
 Champions   Runners up   Third place   Fourth place

World Rankings
 2011 : No. 46 
 2012 : No. 48 
 2013 : No. 34 
 2014 : No. 37 
 2016 : No. 43 
  2017 : No. 41 
  2018 : No. 43 
  2019 : No. 45 
  2020 : No. 45 
  2020 : No. 43 
  2021 : No. 54 
  2022 : No. 52

Team

Current squad
The following is Thailand roster for the 2022 AVC Cup for Men.

Head coach:  Monchai Supajirakol

Former squads

World Championship
  1998 — 19th place
Lawrach Tontongkum, Yutthapol Jarhenrut, Terdsak Sungworakan, Anusorn Charunsiriwont, Panya Makhumleg, Attsphon Khemdaeng, Aphisak Rakchartyingcheep, Yuttana Kiewpekar, Yuttachai Ratanawongpak, Waroot Wisadsing, Khomkroch Phayooncharn and Supachai Jitjumroon. Head Coach: Kun Xing Wu

Asian Championship
 2007 — 6th place
Theerayut Sripon, Wanchai Tabwises, Ronnarong Jarupeng, Attaphon Khemdaeng, Annop Auttakornsiriph, Kittikun Sri-utthawong, Surachai Churat, Supachai Sriphum, Pissanu Harnkhomtun, Sarayut Yutthayong, Supachai Jitjumroon and Ratchapoom Samthong. Head Coach: Sophon Panulawan. 
 2009 — 13th place
Jirayu Raksakaew, Montri Vaenpradab, Wanchai Tabwises, Nattapong Kesapan, Shotivat Tivsuwan, Yuranan Buadang, Kittikun Sri-utthawong, Piyarat Tunthapthai, Pissanu Harnkhomtun, Somporn Wannaprapa, Theerayut Sripon and Saranchit Charoensuk. Head Coach: Monchai Supajirakul.
 2011 — 10th place
Jirayu Raksakaew, Montri Vaenpradab, Wanchai Tabwises, Nattapong Kesapan, Kissada Nilsawai, Shotivat Tivsuwan, Yuranan Buadang, Kittikun Sri-utthawong, Piyarat Tunthapthai, Kitsada Somkane, Teerasak Nakprasong and Saranchit Charoensuk. Head Coach: Monchai Supajirakul
 2013 — 6th place
Jirayu Raksakaew, Montri Vaenpradab, Wanchai Tabwises, Nattapong Kesapan, Kissada Nilsawai, Yuranan Buadang, Kittikun Sri-utthawong, Piyarat Tunthapthai, Kitsada Somkane, Teerasak Nakprasong, Saranchit Charoensuk and Phongpet Namkhuntod. Head Coach: Monchai Supajirakul

Asian Games
 2006 — 11th place
Waroot Wisedsing, Wanchai Tabwises, Ronnarong Jarupeng, Annop Auttakornsiripho, Kittikun Sriutthawong, Supachai Sriphum, Pongsakorn Nimawan, Yuttana Kiewpekar, Sarayut Yutthayong, Songserm Prasertnu, Supachai Jitjumroon and Ratchapoom Samthong. Head Coach: Sophon Panulawan
 2010 — 4th place
Jirayu Raksakaew, Montri Vaenpradab, Wanchai Tabwises, Shotivat Tivsuwan, Yuranan Buadang, Kittikun Sriutthawong, Piyarat Tunthaphai, Pissanu Harnkhomtun, Pongsakorn Nimawan, Somporn Wannaprapa, Kitsada Somkane and Saranchit Charoensuk. Head Coach: Monchai Supajirakul.
 2014 — 7th place
Jirayu Raksakaew, Montri Vaenpradab, Korn Nanboon, Khanit Sinlapasorn, Kittikun Sriutthawong, Kittinon Namkhunthod, Yossapol Wattana, Wuttichai Suksala, Kitsada Somkane, Teerasak Nakprasong, Saranchit Charoensuk and Montri Puanglib. Head Coach: Monchai Supajirakul.

Asian Cup
  2014 — 8th place
Jirayu Raksakaew, Montri Vaenpradab, Korn Nanboon, Kissada Nilsawai, Khanit Sinlapasorn, Kittikun Sri-utthawong, Kittinon Namkhunthod, Yossapol Wattana, Kitsada SomKane, Teerasak Nakprasong, Saranchit Charoensuk and Montri Puanglib Head Coach: Monchai Supajirakul

List of notable former players

 Yutthapol Jarhenrut 
 Attaphon Khemdaeng
 Aphisak Rakchartyingcheep
 Terdsak Sungworakan
 Panya Makhumleg
 Annop Auttakornsiriph
 Pongsakorn Nimawan
 Nutthapon Srisamutnak
 Waroot Wisedsing
 Anusorn Charunsiriwont
 Nattapong Kesapan
 Kiattipong Radchatagriengkai
 Lawrach Tonthongkum 
 Somporn Wannaprapa
 Wanchai Tabwises 
 Yuranan Buadang 
 Phadetsuak Wannachote 
 Theerayut Sripon
 Supachai Sriphum
 Ronnarong Jarupeng
 Yuttana Kiewpekar
 Supachai Jitjumroon 
 Pisanu Harnkhomtun
 Ratchapoom Samthong
 Thanapat Yooyen
 Pattharapong Sripon
 Monchai Supajirakul
 Chamnan Dokmai
 Khomkrich Phayooncharn
 Shotivat Tivsuwan
 Surachai Churat
 Wutthichai Suksala 
 Sarayut Yutthayong 
 Yuttachai Ratanawongpak
 Korn Nanboon
 Khanit Sinlapasorn
 Yossapol Wattana
 Teerasak Nakprasong
 Kitsada Chanchai
 Montri Vaenpradab
 Boonyarit Wongton
 Chakkrit Chandahuadong

See also
 Thailand women's national volleyball team
 Men's Volleyball Thailand League
 Volleyball Thai-Denmark Super League

References

National men's volleyball teams
U
Men's volleyball in Thailand